Azwile Chamane-Madiba is a South African actress.

Career
In 2016, she played the role of "Zodwa" in Akin Omotoso's  film, Vaya, also featuring Phuthi Nakene, Warren Masemola, Nomonde Mbusi, Zimkhitha Nyoka. The film got multiple nominations for the 13th Africa Movie Academy Awards (AMAA) in 2017.

Filmatography

References

External links
 Azwile Chamane-Madiba on IMDb
 Azwile Chamane-Madiba on Metacritic
 Azwile Chamane-Madiba on BFI
 Azwile Chamane-Madiba on Flixanda
 Azwile Chamane-Madiba on Letterboxd

South African actresses
Living people
Year of birth missing (living people)